André du Laurens (December 9, 1558 – August 6, 1609), was a French physician.

Biography 
Du Laurens was born in Tarascon and was rector of the medical school at Montpellier. He was physician to King Henry IV.

His 1594 book comprising four "discourses"—first written in French, not Latin—was an early attempt at scientific communication. It was translated into English by Richard Surphlet in 1599.

His Historia anatomica underwent many editions.

One of his brothers, Honoré du Laurens (1564-1612), was archbishop of Embrun.

Bibliography

Selection 
 Admonitio ad Simonem Petræum (1593)
 Discours de la conservation de la veuë: des maladies melancoliques: des catarrhes, & de la vieillesse (1594)
 1598 and 1600 editions on Gallica; Radu Suciu's edition with an extensive critical apparatus (2012)
 A discourse of the preservation of the sight of melancholike diseases of rheumes and of old age by Andre DuLaurens, translated by Richard Surphlet (1599)—The eyehistory.wordpress.com digitization includes only the first discourse.
 Apologia pro Galeno et impugnatio novæ ac falsæ demonstrationis de communione vasorum cordis in foetu (1595)
 De crisibus libri tres (1596)
 Historia anatomica humani corporis. Paris (1600)
 1602 edition on Google Books
 L’histoire anatomique en laquelle toutes les parties du corps humain sont amplement déclarées enrichie de controverses et observations nouvelles, translated by Francois Size. Paris: Jean Bertault (1610) 
 Historia anatomica: controuersiis, obseruationibus et posterioribus curis authoris adornata (1650)—With additions by Lazare Meyssonnier.

Complete works 
 Toutes les œuvres de Me André Du Laurens, sieur de Ferrières. Paris, 1621 on Google Books —Translation by Théophile Gelée, at least partly revised by the author.
 Patin, Gui, ed.,  (1628) —Complete revised works, some not published before.

References

 Berriot-Salvadore, Évelyne (2008), "Les œuvres françaises d'André Dulaurens", Esculape et Dionysos. Mélanges en l'honneur de Jean Céard, Genève: Droz, p. 243–254.
 —Jeanne is André's sister.
 
 Wear, A. (1983), "William Harvey and the “way of the anatomists”", History of Science, 21, p. 227–230

External links 
 List of online works on Gallica

1558 births
1609 deaths
16th-century French physicians
People from Tarascon
16th-century Latin-language writers
French anatomists
French surgeons